Fuchsia regia is a plant species in the genus Fuchsia native to Brazil.

Subspecies
 Fuchsia regia subsp. regia
 Fuchsia regia subsp. reitzii
 Fuchsia regia subsp. serrae

References

External links
 
 

regia
Flora of Brazil